The 2017–18 Top League was the 15th season of Japan's top-tier domestic rugby union competition, the Top League.

The tournament was won by Suntory Sungoliath for the fifth time, beating Panasonic Wild Knights 12–8 in the final played on 13 January 2018. Kintetsu Liners were automatically relegated to the second-tier Top Challenge League competition for 2018 and NTT DoCoMo Red Hurricanes were also relegated after losing in their relegation play-off match.

Competition rules

In January 2017, the JRFU announced that the Top League competition would be held earlier in the year, in order to aid the Japanese Super Rugby franchise the Sunwolves' preparations for the following season. The sixteen Top League teams would be divided into two conferences for the first stage of the competition; each team would play the seven other teams in their conferences once, plus an extra six matches against teams in the opposite conferences for a total of thirteen matches.

All sixteen teams will then progress to a play-off stage; the top two teams in each conference will advance to the title play-offs, the next two teams in each conference to the 5th-place play-offs, the next two teams in each conference to the 9th-place play-offs and the bottom two teams in each conference to the 13th-place play-offs, which will determine the final positions for the season. The title play-offs will also double as the All-Japan Rugby Football Championship, which would no longer include university teams. The team that finishes 16th will be automatically relegated to the 2018 Top Challenge League, while the other three teams in the 13th-place play-off will all play in relegation play-off matches.

Teams

The following teams took part in the 2017–18 Top League competition:

 NTT DoCoMo Red Hurricanes won the 2016–17 Top League Challenge 1 series to win promotion back to the Top League after a one-season absence.

First stage

Standings

The final standings for the 2017–18 Top League First Stage were:

Matches

The 2017–2018 Top League fixtures are:

Round 1

Round 2

Round 3

Round 4

Round 5

Round 6

Round 7

Round 8

Round 9

Round 10

Round 11

Round 12

Round 13

Second stage

Standings

The final standings for the 2017–18 Top League are:

Title play-offs

The title play-offs also double up as the 55th All-Japan Rugby Football Championship.

5th-place play-offs

9th-place play-offs

13th-place play-offs

Promotion and relegation

Honda Heat was promoted to the 2018–19 Top League as champions of the 2017 Top Challenge League, replacing the 16th-placed Kintetsu Liners.

In addition, there were three promotion/relegation play-offs for three places in the 2018–19 Top League. The teams ranked 13th, 14th and 15th in the Top League played off against the teams ranked 4th, 3rd and 2nd in the 2017 Top Challenge League respectively.

Hino Red Dolphins beat NTT DoCoMo Red Hurricanes 20–17 to replace them in the Top League for 2018–19, with latter being relegated to the Top Challenge League. Coca-Cola Red Sparks and Munakata Sanix Blues retained their places in the Top League for 2018–19, with the former drawing against Mitsubishi Sagamihara DynaBoars and the latter beating Kyuden Voltex.

See also

 2017 Top Challenge League

References

Japan Rugby League One
Top League
Top League